A municipal election was held in Belize on 4 March 2009. Voters elected sixty seven representatives, eighteen in city councils (11 Belize City, 7 Belmopan) and forty nine in town councils.

Participating parties 
 United Democratic Party (incumbents)
 People's United Party
 Vision Inspired by the People (Belmopan only)
 Benque Association (Benque Viejo only)
 People's National Party (Punta Gorda only)
 Congress of the P.G. People (Punta Gorda only)

Belize City 

Mayor of Belize City Zenaida Moya will seek reelection after fighting off a challenge by Councillor Anthony Michael. She will be challenged by retired public officer Dr. Cecil Reneau.

Belmopan 
Simeon Lopez, sitting mayor, won a local convention on August 17, defeating younger challengers Khalid Belisle and subordinate Eugene Brown. He will be challenged by the PUP's Rosalind Casey.

Towns 
The slates for all district towns have been selected.

Schedule 
 February 4: Announcement of polls and nomination date.
 February 9: Presentation of PUP municipal manifestos
 February 16: Candidates for municipal councils formally nominated at local election office.
 February: Presentation of UDP municipal manifestos
 March 4:
 7:00 A.M., opening of polls
 6:00 P.M., close of polls;
8:00 P.M., counting of votes begins.
 March 5: Earliest date each council can be formally sworn into office.

Voter turnout 
 Belize City: 36.8%
 Belmopan: 46.84%
 San Pedro: 61.04%
 Corozal: 52.81%
 Orange Walk: 72.90%
 San Ignacio/Santa Elena: 54.22%
 Benque Viejo: 71.49%
 Dangriga: 41.97%
 Punta Gorda: 58.43%

Final results

Corozal Town

Orange Walk Town

San Ignacio/Santa Elena

Benque Viejo del Carmen Town

Media coverage 
 LOVE FM, Channel 5: Decision 2009
 KREM FM, Krem Television, Channel 7: The Big Test 2009
 WAVE Radio, BBN: Election Watch 2009
 Plus Television (Belmopan), Integrity Radio (Belize City): unknown
 Live Election Results and pictures on www.orangewalk.net by FarWorld Tech of Orange Walk Town, Belize.

2009 elections in Central America 
2009 elections in the Caribbean 
Municipal elections
2009